Mark Bryant (born 1953) is a British historian of cartoons. He has been honorary secretary and vice president of the British Cartoonists' Association and honorary secretary of the London Press Club.

Early life and family
Christopher Mark Bryant was born in Woodyates, Dorset, on 18 October 1953, and graduated in philosophy from the University of London. He later acquired a PhD in history from the University of Kent.

Brother Dr Julius Bryant British Art Historian, Keeper Emeritus of the Victoria and Albert Museum.

Career
Bryant has written a number of books on the history of cartoons and has edited more than thirty short story and cartoon collections.

He has been honorary secretary and vice president of the British Cartoonists' Association and honorary secretary of the London Press Club.

He was a trustee of the Cartoon Museum.

He was awarded a special commendation in the Specialist Reference Book of the Year Award, 1990, for Dictionary of Riddles.

Member Royal Society of Literature

Selected publications

References

External links 
Mark Bryant's contributions to History Today
https://www.youtube.com/watch?v=wrBAK0osMxU

People from Dorset
1953 births
Living people
Alumni of the University of London
Alumni of the University of Kent
English non-fiction writers
English historians
Anthologists
Trustees of arts organizations
English book editors
English journalists